Uromyces lineolatus subsp. nearcticus is a plant pathogen infecting carrots.

References

External links
 Index Fungorum
 USDA ARS Fungal Database

Fungal plant pathogens and diseases
Carrot diseases
lineolatus subsp. nearcticus
Fungi described in 1973